Zeuctophlebia is a genus of moths in the family Geometridae.

Species
Zeuctophlebia squalidata (Walker, 1863)
Zeuctophlebia tapinodes Turner, 1904

References
Natural History Museum Lepidoptera genus database

Oenochrominae